Pachikha is a rural locality (a settlement) in Kushkopalskoye Rural Settlement of Pinezhsky District, Arkhangelsk Oblast, Russia. The population was 202 as of 2010. There are 6 streets.

Geography 
Pachikha is located on the Yula River, 69 km south of Karpogory (the district's administrative centre) by road. Kushkopala is the nearest rural locality.

References 

Rural localities in Pinezhsky District